The Majjhima Nikāya ("Collection of Middle-length Discourses") is a Buddhist scripture collection, the second of the five Nikāyas, or collections, in the Sutta Pitaka, which is one of the "three baskets" that compose the Pali Tipitaka (lit. "Three Baskets") of Theravada Buddhism. Composed between 3rd century BCE and 2nd century CE. This nikaya consists of 152 discourses attributed to the Buddha and his chief disciples.

The Majjhima Nikaya corresponds to the Madhyama Āgama found in the Sutra Pitikas of various Sanskritic early Buddhist schools, fragments of which survive in Sanskrit and in Tibetan translation. A complete Chinese translation from the Sarvāstivādin recension appears in the Chinese Buddhist canon, where it is known as the Zhōng Ahánjīng (中阿含經). The Madhyama Āgama of the Sarvāstivāda school contains 222 sūtras, in contrast to the 152 suttas in the Pāli Majjhima Nikāya.

Structure and contents

List of Majjhima Nikaya suttas

Bhikkhu Bodhi in the introduction to his translation describes the collection as follows:If the Majjhima Nikāya were to be characterised by a single phrase to distinguish it from among the other books of the Pali Canon, this might be done by describing it as the collection that combines the richest variety of contextual settings with the deepest and most comprehensive assortment of teachings.The 152 discourses come in three parts each with five divisions. All divisions save the penultimate contain 10 discourses.

Translations

Full translations 

Bhikkhu Nanamoli and Bhikkhu Bodhi (trans.), The Middle Length Discourses of the Buddha: A Translation of the Majjhima Nikaya, 1995, Somerville: Wisdom Publications .
Mahapandit Rahul Sankrityayan translated Majjhima Nikaya from Prakrit to Hindi.
 Lord Chalmers, trans. (1898–1926), Further Dialogues of the Buddha, 1926–7, vol.1, vol. 2, London:  Pali Text Society. Reprint: Ann Arbor: Books on Demand, University of Michigan.
I.B. Horner (trans.), The Book of Middle Length Sayings, 1954–9, 3 volumes, Bristol: Pali Text Society.
 David W. Evans (trans.), Discourses of Gotama Buddha: Middle Collection, 1991, Janus Pubns. "Translation in an abridged form ... just about one third the size of Horner's translation, but with well over 90% of the significant content"
Bhikkhu Sujato (trans.), The Middle Discourses, 2018, published online at SuttaCentral and released into the public domain.

Selections 
 A Treasury of the Buddha's Words, tr Nanamoli, revised Khantipalo, Bangkok; later revised & expanded to give MLDB above
 Twenty-Five Suttas from Mula-Pannasa, Burma Pitaka Association, Rangoon, 1986?; reprinted Sri Satguru, Delhi
 Twenty-Five Suttas from Majjhima-Pannasa, Myanmar Pitaka Association, Rangoon, 1987; reprinted Sri Satguru, Delhi
 Twenty-Five Suttas from Upari-Pannasa, Myanmar Pitaka Association, Rangoon, 1988?; reprinted Sri Satguru, Delhi

See also 
 Pāli Canon
 Early Buddhist Texts
 Sutta Piṭaka
 List of Majjhima Nikaya suttas
 Anguttara Nikaya
 Digha Nikaya
 Khuddaka Nikaya
 Samyutta Nikaya
 Sammādiṭṭhi Sutta
 Ānāpānasati Sutta

References

External links 

Majjhima Nikāya in English (& 30+ other languages) together with Madhyama Āgama parallels at suttacentral.net
Majjhima Nikaya in English at Metta.lk
Majjhima Nikaya in English at accesstoinsight.org
Majjhima Nikaya lectures taught by Bhikkhu Bodhi
Majjhima Nikaaya III, II. 3.5.Maagandiyasutta.m, III. 2. 5.Bahudhaatukasutta.m-, (115) The Discourse on Many Elements at budsas.org
Entry for Mādhyamāgama, Digital Dictionary of Buddhism at buddhism-dict.net
 Selected Suttas of the Majjhima Nikaya, transl. by Bhikkhu Bodhi, Wisdom Publications
Seven Games of India in the 6th Century B.C.

 
Theravada Buddhist texts